Boudreville is a commune in the Côte-d'Or department in eastern France, in which the forest nearby (Le Bois de Fée) has a large population of boar, deer, and other animals. The forest is owned by George Garnier.

Population

See also
Communes of the Côte-d'Or department

References

Communes of Côte-d'Or
Côte-d'Or communes articles needing translation from French Wikipedia